Africable is a free-to-air, French-language, pan-African TV-channel headquartered in Bamako, Mali.
The channel launched on June 26, 2004, born from the desire of young cable operators in Francophone-Africa.

Programming
Africable's programming focuses on the African unity and pride. Their slogan is "La Chaîne du Continent". The channel broadcasts news programmes ("Journal") from ORTM (Mali), RTI (Ivory Coast), RTS 1 (Sénégal), RTB (Burkina-Faso), ORTB (Benin), Télé Sahel (Niger), CRTV (Cameroon), RTG1 (Gabon) and RTG (Guinea).

Availability
 Via MMDS-antenna
Benin
Burkina Faso
Cameroon
Chad
Gabon
Guinea
Mali
Niger
Sénégal
Togo
 Via UHF-antenna
Burkina Faso
Niger
Sénégal
 Via Satellite Intelsat 707
Africa
Europe
 Via Satellite Eutelsat W3A
Europe
North Africa
Middle East

See also
 Television in Mali

References

External links
Official website

Publicly funded broadcasters
Malian television
Broadcasting companies of Mali
French-language television networks
International broadcasters
Television channels and stations established in 2004
2004 establishments in Mali
Bamako